Southampton Spitfires are a rugby league team based in Netley Abbey. They play in the South East Division of the Rugby League Conference.

History 
Southampton Spitfires Rugby League Club was formed during the summer of 2007 by Yorkshireman Glenn Tyreman and a group of Rugby League enthusiasts based in Tyreman's adopted home of Southampton. He previously coached New Earswick All Blacks, Heworth, Basingstoke Beasts, St Albans Centurions, Kent Ravens, South West of England Wildcats, London & South East, London UK, South of England, England Lionhearts and Harlequins RL. In 2007 the Spitfires played their first ever match against Kent Ravens in a London League game and won 56-16.

The following season in 2008 the Spitfires moved into the London League again played a total of 8 games, winning four and losing four. This was enough to secure 3rd place in the table and a play-off semi-final against West London Sharks. The Spitfires lost to the Sharks in a close game who eventually went on to beat Bedford Tigers in the final. The Spitfires then applied to join the new South East Division of the Rugby League Conference and were accepted for 2009. 
 
At the start of 2009 the Spitfires entered the Cheltenham 9s finishing a respectable 6th out of 12 with one win over Lymm Wolves and two defeats. Their final pre-season friendly saw them go down 32-12 away to Guildford Giants. In 2010, the club moved to the Station Road Recreation Ground in Netley and share the ground with football club Netley Central Sports.

Honours

League honours
Southern Counties Championships
Winners: 2011 (Representing as Hampshire)

References

External links
Official site
Official Facebook page
Official Twitter account

Rugby League Conference teams
Sport in Southampton
Rugby clubs established in 2007
Rugby league teams in Hampshire
English rugby league teams
2007 establishments in England